The 2018–19 Ole Miss Rebels women's basketball team represented the University of Mississippi during the 2018–19 NCAA Division I women's basketball season. The Rebels, led by first-year head coach Yolett McPhee-McCuin, played their home games at the Pavilion at Ole Miss and competed as members of the Southeastern Conference (SEC). They finished the season 9–22, 3–13 in SEC play to finish in a tie for twelfth place. They lost in the first round of the SEC women's tournament to Florida.

Previous season
The Rebels finished the season with a 12–19 overall record and a 1–15 record in conference play. One day after ending their season with a loss to Missouri in the second round of the SEC Tournament, fifth-year head coach Matt Insell was fired. One month later, McPhee-McCuin was hired to replace him.

Roster

Schedule

|-
!colspan=9 style=| Exhibition

|-
!colspan=9 style=| Non-conference regular season

|-
!colspan=9 style=| SEC regular season

|-
!colspan=9 style=| SEC Women's tournament

See also
•2019 Ole Miss Rebels football team
•2018-19 Ole Miss Rebels men's basketball team
•2019 Ole Miss Rebels baseball team

References

Ole Miss Rebels women's basketball seasons
Ole Miss
Ole Miss Rebels
Ole Miss Rebels